General elections were held in British India in 1920 to elect members to the Imperial Legislative Council and the Provincial Councils. They were the first elections in the country's modern history.

The new Central Legislative Assembly which was the lower chamber of the Imperial Legislative Council was based in Delhi had 104 elected seats, of which 66 were contested and thirty eight were reserved for Europeans elected through the Chambers of Commerce. For the upper chamber, the Council of State, 24 of the 34 seats were contested, whilst five were reserved for Muslims, three for Whites, one for Sikhs and one for the United Provinces. The Parliament was opened by the Duke of Connaught and Strathearn on 9 February 1921.

Alongside the national elections there were also elections to 637 seats in Provincial Assemblies. Of these, 440 were contested, 188 had a single candidate elected unopposed. Despite the calls by Mahatma Gandhi for a boycott of the elections, only six had no candidate. Within the Provincial Assemblies 38 were reserved for White voters.

Results

Central Legislative Assembly

Members of Central Legislative Assembly

Officials

Government of India

Nominated from Provinces

Nominated Non-Officials
 Special Interests: Henry Gidney (Anglo-Indian), N. M. Joshi (Labour Interests), J. P. Cotelingam (Indian Christians), Rai Sheo Prasad Tulshan Bahadur (Railway Interests)
 Provinces: T. V. Seshagiri Iyer (Madras), C. Krishnaswami Rao (Madras), Ashraf O. Jamall (Bengal), Nawab Khwaja Habibullah (Bengal), N. M. Samarth (Bombay), Mahomed Hajeebhoy (Bombay), Maulvi Abdul Quadir (Central Provinces), Lakshmi Narayan Lal (Bihar & Orissa), Sardar Bahadur Gajjan Singh (Punjab), Rana Umanath Bakhsh Singh (United Provinces), B. H. R. Jatkar (Berar), Abdur Rahim (North West Frontier Province)

Elected Non-Officials
Assam: Debi Charan Barua (Assam Valley General), Girish Chandra Nag (Surma Valley General), Maulvi Amjad Ali (Muslim), George Bridge (European), Lt. Col. D. Herbert (European)
Bengal: Sir Deva Prosad Sarbadhicari (Calcutta Urban General), Jogendra Nath Mukherjee (Calcutta Suburbs Urban General), K. C. Neogy (Dacca Rural General), Jadu Nath Majumdar (Presidency General), Tara Prosanna Mukherji (Burdwan General), Jogesh Chandra Chaudhuri (Chittagong & Rajshahi Rural General), Prince Afsar-ul-Mulk Mirza Muhammad Akram Hussain (Calcutta & Suburbs Muslim), Zahiruddin Ahmed (Dacca Muslim), Maulvi Abul Kasem (Dacca Rural Muslim), Khabeeruddin Ahmed (Rajshahi Muslim), Saiyed Muhammad Abdulla (Burdwan & Calcutta Presidency Muslim), Munshi Abdul Rahman (Chittagong Muslim), Ghani Khan Gabkhan (Bakerganj Muslim re-polls), Darcy Lindsay (European), Frank Carter (European), W. S. J. Wilson (European), A. D. Pickford (European), R. J. G. Ballantyne (European), Satish Chandra Ghosh (Landholders), Nibaran Chandra Sircar (Bengal National Chamber of Commerce), D. K. Mitter
Bihar & Orissa: Babu Baidyanath Prashad Singh (Tirhut General), Babu Adit Prashad Sinha (Tirhut General), B. N. Misra (Orissa General), Babu Braja Sundar Das (Orissa General), Rai Bahadur Lachmi Prasad Sinha (Gaya cum Monghyr General), Sarfaraz Hussain Khan (Tirhut Muslim), Maulvi Miyan Asjad-ul-lah (Bhagalpur Muslim), Syed Muhammad Ismail (Patna and Chota Nagpur cum Orissa Muslim), Raja R. N. Bhanja Deo (Landholders), Raja Sivanandan Prasad Singh (Landholders), Babu Ambika Prasad Sinha, Satya Narain Singh
Bombay: Sir Jamsetjee Jejeebhoy (Bombay City General), Chimanlal Harilal Setalvad (Bombay City General), Jamnadas Dwarkadas Dharamsy (Bombay City General), Keshao Ganesh Bagde (Bombay Central Rural), Balkrishna Sitaram Kamat (Bombay Central Rural), Sardar Bomanji Ardeshir Dalal (Bombay Northern Rural), Anna Babaji Latthe (Bombay Southern Rural), Seth Harchandrai Vishandas (Sind Rural General), Salebhoy Karimji Barodawala (Bombay City Muslim), Sardar Gulam Jilani Bijlikhan (Bombay Central Muslim), Shaikh Abdul Majid (Sind Urban Muslim), Alibaksh Mahomed Hussein (Sind Rural Muslim), Wali Mohamed Hussanally (Sind Rural Muslim), Reginald Arthur Spence (European), Edwin Lessware Price (European), Sir Montagu de Pomeray Webb (European), N. B. Saklatvala (Bombay Millowners Association), Rahimtoola Currimbhoy (Bombay Millowners Association), Vithaldas Thackersey (Bombay Millowners Association), Manmohandas Ramji (Indian Merchants Chamber), S. C. Shahani (Sind Jagirdars & Zamindars)
Burma: F. McCarthy (Europeans), Padamji Ginwala (General), Maung Maung Sin (General), J. C. Chatterji (General), J. N. Basu (General)
Central Provinces: Hari Singh Gour (Nagpur General), Kunj Bihari Lall Agnihotri (Hindi Divisions General), Pyari Lal Misra (Hindi Divisions General), Muhammad Ahsan Khan (Muslim), Beohar Raghubir Sinha (Landholders)
Madras: T. Rangachari (Madras City General), C. S. Subrahmanayam (Madras ceded districts & Chittoor Rural General), Patri Venkata Srinivasa Rao (Guntur cum Nellore General), B. Venkatapatiraju (Ganjam cum Kistna General), J. Ramayya Pantulu (Godavari cum Krishna General), Sambanda Mudaliar (Salem & Coimbatore General), P. S. Sivaswami Iyer (Tanjore & Trichy General), M. Krishnaswamy Reddi (Chingleput cum South Arcot General), K. M. Nayar (West Coast & Nilgiris General), T. Muhammad Hussain Saheb Bahadur (Madras Muslim), Mahmood Schamnad Saheb Bahadur (West Coast & Nilgiris Muslim), Mir Asad Ali (Muslim), Muhammad Habibullah (Muslim), R. E. V. Arbuthnot (Commerce), Narayandas Girdhardas (Commerce), Eardley Norton (European), Rama Varma Valia Raja Chirakkal (Landholders)
Punjab: Pandit Jawahar Lal Bhargava (Ambala General), Bakshi Sohan Lal (Jullundur General), Dr. Nand Lal (West Punjab General), Chaudhari Ghulam Sarwar Khan (North Punjab Muslim), Ahmad Baksh Khan (North West Punjab Muslim), Chaudhri Shahab-ud-din (East Central Punjab Muslim), Nawab Mohammad Ibrahim Ali Khan (East Punjab Muslim), Chaudhri Shahab-ud-din (East Central Punjab Muslim), Makhdum Syed Rajan Baksh Shah (South West Punjab Muslim), Raja M. M. Ikramullah Khan, Bhai Man Singh (East Punjab Sikh), Sardar Gulab Singh (West Punjab Sikh), Baba Ujagar Singh Bedi (Landholders)
United Provinces: Munshi Iswar Saran (UP Cities General), Pyare Lal (Meerut Rural General), Lala Girdharilal Agarwala (Agra General), Pandit Radha Kishen Das (Rohilkund & Kumaon General), Bishambhar Nath (Allahabad and Jhansi General), Sankata Prasad Bajpai (Lucknow General), Munshi Mahadeo Prasad (Benaras and Gorakhpur General), Raja Suraj Baksh Singh (Fyzabad General), Haji Wajihuddin (UP Cities Muslim), Muhammad Yamin Khan (Meerut Muslim), Mohammad Faiyaz Khan (Agra Muslim), Syed Nabi Hadi (Rohilkund & Kumaon Muslim), S. M. Zahid Ali Subzposh (UP Southern Muslim), Syed Haider Karrar Jafri (Lucknow and Fyzabad Muslim), Raja Kushal Pal Singh (Landholders), Sir Logie Pirie Watson (European)

Members of the Council of State

See also
1920 Madras Presidency legislative council election

References

1920 elections in India
1920
1920
1920
Central Legislative Assembly of India
1920
Provincial Assembly elections in British India